Ermes Borsetti (August 25, 1913 in Vercelli – 23 September 2005) was an Italian professional football player.

He played for 10 seasons (187 games, 44 goals) in the Serie A for U.S. Pro Vercelli Calcio, ACF Fiorentina, A.S. Roma and A.C. Torino.

Honours
 Serie A champion: 1941/42.

1913 births
2005 deaths
People from Vercelli
Year of death missing
Italian footballers
Serie A players
F.C. Pro Vercelli 1892 players
ACF Fiorentina players
A.S. Roma players
Torino F.C. players
Calcio Lecco 1912 players
Association football midfielders